Niloufar Talebi is an author, literary translator, librettist, multidisciplinary artist, and producer. She was born in London to Iranian parents. Her work has been presented by, and/or performed at Carnegie Hall, Cal Performances, Atlanta Symphony Orchestra, American Lyric Theater, Hammer Museum, Los Angeles County Museum of Art, Craft and Folk Art Museum, Riverside Theatre, Royce Hall, ODC/Dance Theater, Berkeley Repertory Theatre, Magic Theatre, Intersection for the Arts, SOMArts Cultural Center, John F. Kennedy Center for the Performing Arts, Stanford University, and Brooklyn Academy of Music.

She took a BA in Comparative Literature from the University of California, Irvine (UCI), and an MFA from the Writing Seminars at Bennington College. She studied Performance Art at UCI, and Method Acting at the Shelton Studios.

Talebi has held residencies at the Ledig House International Writer's Residency at Omi International Arts Center, the Ruth Asawa San Francisco School of the Arts, the American Lyric Theater’s Composer/Librettist Development Program, the Washington National Opera's American Opera Initiative, and John Zorn's The Stone during Visionintoart's inaugural Ferus Festival in 2014.

Her most recent multidisciplinary project is her hybrid memoir, Self-Portrait in Bloom, and its companion opera, Abraham in Flames, both inspired by the life and work of the Iranian poet, Ahmad Shamlou. Self-Portrait in Bloom contains 30 of Shamlou's poems and his other works in Talebi's English translation.

Works

Belonging: New Poetry by Iranians Around the World
Talebi is the Editor and Translator of the anthology, Belonging: New Poetry by Iranians Around the World (North Atlantic Books, 2008), featuring 18 contemporary Iranian poets living outside of Iran since the 1979 Iranian Revolution.

Four Springs
A multimedia and theatrical performance dramatizing 10 poems from Belonging: New Poetry by Iranians Around the World. Performances were at the ODC Theater, and the Mexican Heritage Plaza in the San Francisco Bay Area (2004). Talebi recited/performed the poems in collaboration with composers Hafez Modirzadeh and Mohamad Nejad, and dance artists from Afsaneh Ballet.

Midnight Approaches
DVD of several short video-poems including some footage from the performances of Four Springs. Select video-poems were published by Rattapallax magazine and have screened at festivals internationally, including at the Berlin Zebra Poetry Film Festival, and Visible Verse Festival in Canada. Released in 2006.

ICARUS/RISE
ICARUS/RISE (World premiere, Theatre Artaud, November 15–17, 2007) is a one-hour multimedia theatrical performance of 17 poems from Belonging: New Poetry by Iranians Around the World woven together to tell the 30-year story of the Iranian migration. Created and recited/performed by Niloufar Talebi, with dramaturgy by poet/translator Zack Rogow, music by Bobak Salehi, dance and video by Alex Ketley. The performances were edited into a professionally produced DVD available for On-Demand streaming on Vimeo.

The Persian Rite of Spring: the story of Nowruz
The Persian Rite of Spring (World premiere, Los Angeles County Museum of Art, March 14, 2010) is a 35-min multimedia performance that brings to life the mythology, poetry, music, and folklore of Nowruz/Norouz from Winter Solstice through 13-bedar: یلدا جشن سده چهارشنبه سوری نوروز سیزده بدر. Created and narrated by Niloufar Talebi, with music and video by Bobak Salehi. Commissioned by the Farhang Foundation. The performance was edited into a professionally produced DVD available for On-Demand streaming on Vimeo.

Ātash Sorushān (Fire Angels)
Talebi wrote the libretto for this song cycle reflecting on the decade since 9/11 with composer Mark Grey for Soprano Jessica Rivera and tenor Stuart Skelton. The chamber version of Ātash Sorushān (Fire Angels) was co-commissioned by Meet the Composer, Carnegie Hall (World premiere, March 29, 2011), and Cal Performances, (West Coast-premiere, April 3, 2011). The expanded and orchestral version was commissioned by the Atlanta Symphony Orchestra (ASO) (World premiere, March 20–21, 2014).

The Disinherited
Talebi is librettist of a one-act opera with composer Clarice Assad, during her Artist Residency in the American Lyric Theater Composer Librettist Development Program (2013-2014). The Disinherited is set in 1983 Tehran during the Iran-Iraq war, when the fate and safety of a young boy who could be forced to walk over and clear minefields lies between tightly held family secrets. It had a workshop performance at Symphony Space Thalia theater in New York City with mezzo-soprano Sarah Heltzel as Mina Safavi, bass-baritone Adrian Rosas as Bahram Safavi, and tenor Glenn Seven Allen as Shayan Safavi (June 16, 2014).

The Investment
Talebi is librettist for a one-act opera, with composer John Liberatore, set in Silicon Valley, and commissioned by the Washington National Opera's American Opera Initiative, (premiered at the John F. Kennedy Center for the Performing Arts, November 2014).

The Plentiful Peach
Adaptation of a children's story by the Iranian writer Samad Behrangi with composer Mark Grey for the Los Angeles Children's Chorus. World premiere at Stanford University's Bing Theater (Stanford Live), April 19, 2015, and was performed during the LACC summer 2015 USA tour.

Epiphany
Talebi is librettist for an immersive requiem inspired by the Latin Mass and Tibetan Book of the Dead, with composer-impresario and Visionintoart founder, Paola Prestini, and visual artist Ali Hossaini and the Young People's Chorus of New York City founded by MacArthur Fellow Francisco J. Núñez. World premiere at the BAM Next Wave Festival of the Brooklyn Academy of Music, November 4–7, 2015. It was performed as a concert at the Brooklyn-based venue, National Sawdust as part of the VIA Ferus Festival on January 15, 2016.

Vis & I
Novel of the Year in 1998 (Persian Literature Award), Vis & I (l'Aleph, 2017) is a gritty novel by Iranian writer, Farideh Razi, translated by Niloufar Talebi. The International Journal of Persian Literature says, "This book serves as a testament to how a translation can bring alive a work of brilliant prose by keeping intact vivid images...Farideh Razi’s depiction of the classically ingrained ideas and ideals of the Iranian mind as pertains to romance and its epic proportions is NOT lost in translation...Talebi deserves recognition for being a new resounding—and resonating—voice for Persian creative writing through her insightful translation."

A review in Boston University's Pusteblume: Journal of Translation recognizes the revival in Vis and I of the dormant voice of Vis, a triumphant Medieval and Eastern heroine, as "a turning point in Iranian women's writing," and remarks: "Translator and scholar, Niloufar Talebi's translation of Vis and I into English has proved her dedication to explaining the concerns of Iranian women to an international audience. In doing so, she has given Vis' story the ability to reach audiences outside of Iran."

Abraham in Flames
A 70-minute, one-act opera inspired by the life and writings of Iranian poet, Ahmad Shamlou (1925-2000), conceived and created by Talebi with director Roy Rallo and composer Aleksandra Vrebalov. Abraham in Flames world premiered as an immersive performance on May 9–12, 2019 at San Francisco's Z Space to critical acclaim. The work is written for girls chorus as the main character and five soloists. The title of the opera is adapted from the title of Shamlou's 1974 book of poems, Abraham in Flames (Ebrahim dar Aatash, elsewhere translated under the title, Abraham in the Fire). Talebi's translations of Ahmad Shamlou's poems were selected for the 2014 National Endowment for the Arts Literature Translation Fellowship.

Seven years in the making against many odds, Abraham in Flames is commissioned, produced, and presented by Niloufar Talebi Projects.
 
In October 2019 The Knight of Illumination Awards USA announced that Abraham in Flames production and lighting designer Heather Carson was shortlisted in its "Lighting Award for Opera" category.

Joshua Kosman of the San Francisco Chronicle listed Abraham in Flames as a Best in 2019 in classical and new music performances.

Self-Portrait in Bloom
"Self-Portrait in Bloom (l'Aleph, 2019)  is a lyrical exploration of the self, of releasing the past and making sense of the deep pain that once examined, leads to an unsteady freedom. Told in fragments of prose, poetry, and photographs, Niloufar Talebi builds a world that covers personal history, an homage to Tehran, the city of her childhood, a portrait of the poet Ahmad Shamlou, her English translation of 30 of Shamlou's poems, and makes a cases for the role of translation in the visibility of cultures. Talebi at once splits open the indelible impact of the larger-than-life poet in her life, and de-idolizes the figure. She contends with the great dismissals of men, and finally speaks of betrayals and sufferings that were not only hers, but also belonged to Shamlou before Talebi would inherit them. And what is revealed is Talebi's truth, a reblossoming of a life that will no longer be silenced."

Author Amy Tan says of Self-Portrait in Bloom: "Brilliant writers can have brilliant debuts..." The Rumpus praises it as "a hybrid wonder" in an epistolary review that The Poetry Foundation calls a "fan letter." An in-depth review in Asterix Journal contextualizes why the writing of Self-Portrait in Bloom was an act of resistance against an act of silencing and its greater, cultural ramification beyond the personal damage to Talebi.

Consequence Magazine published an excerpt of Self-Portrait in Bloom set during the Iran-Iraq War in November 2019 accompanied by photographs of the war by photographer, Alfred Yaghobzadeh.

TEDx Talk
On March 9, 2019, Niloufar delivered a talk at UC Berkeley titled, "On Making Beauty After Agony," on how she harnessed the obstacles presented to her in introducing the work of Ahmad Shamlou to Western audiences into creating Self-Portrait in Bloom and Abraham in Flames.

Ahmad Shamlou Videopoems
"Funeral Address," a videopoem by Niloufar Talebi and Bobak Salehi that brings to life Ahmad Shamlou's poem, "خطابه ی تدفین", was released on July 23, 2020 to commemorate the 20th anniversary of the revolutionary poet's passing.

Awards and Fellowships
 2021-2022 Fulbright U.S. Scholar Fulbright Program
 2018 National Endowment for the Arts Opera grant with the Young Women's Chorus of SF
 2017 California Arts Council 
 2017 New Music USA 
 2017 San Francisco Arts Commission Individual Artist Commission
 2016 Creative Work Fund 
 2015 Talebi's Ahmad Shamlou translations selected for a National Endowment for the Arts Translation Fellowship
 2015 San Francisco Arts Commission Individual Artist Commission 
 2014 San Francisco Arts Commission Individual Artist Commission 
 2008 Belonging: New Poetry by Iranians Around the World nominated for the Northern California Book Award
 2006 PEN American Center/New York State Council on the Arts Anthology grant
 2006 Willis Barnstone Translation Prize 
 2005 American Literary Translators Association Fellowship
 2004 International Center for Writing and Translation

Publications 

 Translator contributor

References

External links 
 

Living people
British emigrants to the United States
Bennington College alumni
University of California, Irvine alumni
Year of birth missing (living people)
American artists
British non-fiction writers
American translators
American women writers
Iranian translators
Persian–English translators
20th-century Iranian women writers
20th-century American women writers
21st-century Iranian women writers
21st-century American women writers
American non-fiction writers